Ion Haidu may refer to:
Ion Haidu (athlete), Romanian decathlete
Ion Haidu (footballer) (born 1942), Romanian footballer